Andreas Kilingaridis (5 August 1976 – 12 June 2013) was a Russian-born Greek sprint racer who had been competing from the early 2000s.

Kilingaridis was born in Saratov, Russia.  He was eliminated in the heats of the C-1 500 m event while being disqualified in the C-1 1000 m event at the 2000 Summer Olympics in Sydney. Four years later in Athens, Kilingaridis was eliminated in the semifinals of both the C-1 500 m and the C-1 1000 m events. At the 2008 Summer Olympics in Beijing, he was eliminated in the semifinals of those same events. He died at the age of 37 while at a competition in Poland after falling into a coma brought on by leukaemia.

References
 Sports-Reference.com profile

1976 births
2013 deaths
Canoeists at the 2000 Summer Olympics
Canoeists at the 2004 Summer Olympics
Canoeists at the 2008 Summer Olympics
Greek male canoeists
Olympic canoeists of Greece
Sportspeople from Saratov
Deaths from leukemia